Lygodactylus mombasicus is a species of gecko found in coastal Kenya and northern Tanzania.

References

Lygodactylus
Reptiles of Kenya
Reptiles of Tanzania
Reptiles described in 1935
Taxa named by Arthur Loveridge